Roger Matthews may refer to:

 Roger Matthews (criminologist) (born 1948), British criminologist
 Roger Matthews (archaeologist) (born 1954), British archaeologist